Gilbert N. Sterr (July 3, 1900 – March 12, 1974) was a player in the National Football League for the Racine Tornadoes in 1926. He played at the collegiate level at Carroll University.

Biography
Sterr was born on July 3, 1900, in Beaver Dam, Wisconsin. He died there in 1974.

References

1900 births
1974 deaths
Players of American football from Wisconsin
American football quarterbacks
Carroll Pioneers football players
Racine Tornadoes players
People from Beaver Dam, Wisconsin
Sportspeople from the Milwaukee metropolitan area